Concobona Creek is a stream in the U.S. state of Mississippi. It is a tributary to Turkey Creek.

Concobona Creek is a name derived from the Choctaw language purported to mean either "chicken hawks go there " or "mallard duck".

References

Rivers of Mississippi
Rivers of Newton County, Mississippi
Mississippi placenames of Native American origin